The discography of Lil Jon, an American rapper, consists of 7 studio albums and 15 singles. Lil Jon was the lead vocalist for the group Lil Jon & the East Side Boyz from 1997 to 2004. Since the group broke up, Lil Jon has continued to produce his own music and tracks for other artists.

In 1997, Lil Jon & the East Side Boyz debuted with Get Crunk, Who U Wit: Da Album. After releasing We Still Crunk!! in 2000, the group signed to TVT Records. Under TVT the group put out three albums: Put Yo Hood Up in 2001, Kings of Crunk in 2002, and Crunk Juice in 2004. Two collaborative singles with the Ying Yang Twins, "Get Low" and "Salt Shaker", made the top ten of the US Billboard Hot 100 chart in 2003 and 2004 respectively. Lil Jon & the East Side Boyz disbanded after Crunk Juice, but Lil Jon continued his music career with many produced hit singles such as "Girlfight" by Brooke Valentine, "The Anthem" by Pitbull, and "Do You Remember" by Jay Sean. Lil Jon began recording his solo debut album, Crunk Rock, in 2006, and "Snap Yo Fingers" (featuring E-40 and Sean P) was the debut single for that album. Many delays led it to be released in 2010.

Albums

Studio albums

Compilation albums

Soundtrack appearances and/or production
 1999 - The Wood: Music from the Motion Picture
 2000 - Big Momma's House Soundtrack
 2002 - Love and a Bullet Soundtrack
 2002 - Barbershop 2: Back In Business Soundtrack
 2005 - XXX: State of the Union Soundtrack
 2005 - Hustle & Flow Motion Picture Soundtrack
 2005 - MTV VMA Score 2005 (with Mike Shinoda)
 2009 - Fast & Furious Motion Picture Soundtrack
 2009 - The Hangover: Original Motion Picture Soundtrack
 2012 - Step Up Revolution: Music From The Motion Picture
 2013 - Turbo: Music from the Motion Picture Soundtrack
 2015 - We Are Your Friends: Original Motion Picture Soundtrack
 2015 - Alvin and the Chipmunks: The Road Chip: Original Motion Picture Soundtrack
 2015 - Furious 7: Original Motion Picture Soundtrack
 2016 - Office Christmas Party: Motion Picture Soundtrack 
 2018 - Superfly: Music from the Motion Picture
 2020 - Bad Boys for Life (The Soundtrack) (with Pitbull)

Extended plays

Singles

As lead artist

A.  In the UK "Real Nigga Roll Call" charted as "Roll Call" together with "What U Gon' Do" and "Lovers & Friends" together with "Get Low" as two separate double A-side singles.

As featured artist

Promotional singles

Other charted songs

Guest appearances

Notes

References

Discographies of American artists
Hip hop discographies